Bradley Klahn was the defending champion, but lost in the semifinals to Jared Donaldson.

Donaldson went on to win the title, defeating Nicolas Meister 6–1, 6–4 in the final.

Seeds

Draw

Finals

Top half

Bottom half

References
 Main Draw
 Qualifying Draw

Royal Lahaina Challenger - Singles